Xu Deheng (October 17, 1890 – February 8, 1990) was a Chinese male politician, who served as the vice chairperson of the Chinese People's Political Consultative Conference.

References 

1890 births
1990 deaths
Vice Chairpersons of the National Committee of the Chinese People's Political Consultative Conference
National University of Peking alumni
Burials at Babaoshan Revolutionary Cemetery